My People is a studio album by Austrian-born jazz musician Joe Zawinul which was recorded and released in 1996.

Recording and music 

The album was recorded in 1996. The music draws on several international influences. "The musical structures are linear, the rhythms full of intricacies welded to Zawinul's love affair with the groove, the synthesizer textures usually sparer than ever. There are vocals in several languages".

Reception 

The AllMusic reviewer suggested that the album was more world music than jazz, and concluded: "Hear it; you purists may be jiggling along in spite of yourselves." The Penguin Guide to Jazz described it as "hugely disappointing", containing "a drab residue of common riffs, rhythms and disharmonies".

Track listing 

 "Introduction to a Mighty Theme"
 "Waraya"
 "Bimoya"
 "You Want Some Tea, Grandpa?"
 "Slivovitz Trail"
 "Ochy-Bala/Pazyryk"
 "Orient Express"
 "Erdäpfee Blues (Potato Blues)"
 "Mi Gente"
 "In an Island Way"
 "Many Churches"

Personnel 
 Joe Zawinul – lead vocals, keyboards, programming
 Bobby Malach – tenor Saxophone
 Mike Mossman – trumpet, piccolo, trombone 
 Gary Poulson – guitar (tracks 2, 5, 9)
 Osmane Kouyake – guitar (track 3)
 Amit Chatterjee – guitar (5, 7, 9, 11)
 Matt Garrison – bass (tracks 2–3, 5, 8)
 Richard Bona – bass (tracks 6–7)
 Paco Sery – drums, percussion
 Ivan Zawinul – drums programming
 Arto Tuncboyaciyan – percussion
 Souleymane Doumbia – percussion
 Trilok Gurtu  – percussion
 Salif Keita – lead vocals

Production
 Joe Zawinul – producer 
 Ivan Zawinul – co-producer, mixing
 Joachim Becker – executive producer 
 Ted Jensen – mastering 
 Arthur Rothstein, Dorothea Lange, Fenno Jacobs, Russell Lee, U.S. FSA Collection – photography

References 

Joe Zawinul albums
1996 albums